SMS Kaiser  was the lead ship of the s;  was her sister ship. Named for the title "Kaiser", held by the leader of the then newly created German Empire, the ship was laid down in the Samuda Brothers shipyard in London in 1871. The ship was launched in March 1874 and commissioned into the German fleet in February 1875. Kaiser mounted a main battery of eight  guns in a central battery amidships.

Kaiser served with the fleet from her commissioning until 1896, though she was frequently placed in reserve throughout her career. The ship was a regular participant in the annual fleet training maneuvers conducted with the exception of the mid-1880s, when she was temporarily replaced by newer vessels. She participated in several cruises in the Baltic and Mediterranean, often escorting Kaiser Wilhelm II on official state visits. Kaiser was rebuilt in the early 1890s as an armored cruiser, though she was too slow to perform satisfactorily in this role. Nevertheless, she spent several years as the flagship of the East Asia Squadron before returning to Germany in 1899. She was used in secondary roles after 1904, until after the end of World War I in 1919, when she was broken up for scrap.

Design 

Designed by Edward James Reed in 1869, the ships were among the most powerful casemate ships built by any navy, though they were rendered obsolescent by the time they were completed by the advent of the turret ship.

Kaiser was powered by one 2-cylinder single-expansion steam engine, which was supplied with steam by eight coal-fired trunk boilers. The boilers were vented into two widely spaced funnels. She was also equipped with a full ship rig to supplement the steam engines. Her standard complement consisted of 32 officers and 568 enlisted men.

She was armed with a main battery of eight  L/20 guns mounted in a central casemate amidships. As built, the ship was also equipped with a single  L/22 gun. After being rebuilt in 1891–1895, her armament was increased by six  L/22 guns and one 8.8 cm L/30 gun, four and later twelve  auto-cannons for defense against torpedo boats. She also received five  torpedo tubes, all mounted in the ship's hull above the waterline.

Service history 
Kaiser was ordered by the Imperial Navy from the Samuda Brothers shipyard in London; her keel was laid in 1871. Kaiser and her sister Deutschland were ordered shortly after the end of the Franco-Prussian War, under the assumption that the French would quickly attempt a war of revenge. The ship was launched on 19 March 1874 and commissioned into the German fleet on 13 February 1875.

After commissioning in February 1875, Kaiser spent the spring working up her engines to be ready for the annual summer training cruise. The four-ship squadron remained in German waters for the entirety of the cruise, which finished with a review of the flotilla in Rostock by Kaiser Wilhelm I in September. The squadron was reactivated the next spring; Rear Admiral Carl Ferdinand Batsch replaced Henk as the squadron commander.

At around the time Batch's squadron was working up for the summer cruise, Henry Abbott, the German consul in Salonika, then in the Ottoman Empire, was murdered. Further attacks on German citizens living in the area were feared, and so Batsch was ordered to sail to the Mediterranean Sea to stage a naval demonstration in June 1876. After arriving with the four ironclads, he was reinforced by three unarmored vessels. After the threat of violence subsided in August, Batsch departed with Kaiser and Deutschland; the other two ironclads remained in the Mediterranean for the rest of the summer.

Kaiser joined the 1877 summer squadron, composed of Deutschland, Friedrich Carl, and the new turret ironclad . The squadron was again sent to the Mediterranean, in response to unrest in the Ottoman Empire related to the Russo-Turkish War; the violence threatened German citizens living there. The squadron, again under the command of Batsch, steamed to the ports of Haifa and Jaffa in July 1877, but found no significant tensions ashore. Batsch then departed and cruised the Mediterranean for the remainder of the summer, returning to Germany in October.

Kaiser and her sister Deutschland remained in reserve for the next six years. They were reactivated in the spring of 1883 for the summer maneuvers under the command of Wilhelm von Wickede. Due to their long period out of service, their engines proved troublesome during the training cruise. Regardless, the 1883 cruise was the first year the German navy completely abandoned the use of sails on its large ironclads. Kaiser went into reserve during the 1884 maneuvers, which were conducted by a homogenous squadron composed of the four s.

In May 1888, Kaiser represented Germany at Barcelona's World Fair, which held a naval review. During the summer of 1889, Kaiser joined the fleet that steamed to Great Britain to celebrate the coronation of Kaiser Wilhelm II; the ship joined her sister Deutschland and the turret ships Preussen and Friedrich der Grosse in II Division. The fleet then held training maneuvers in the North Sea under command of Rear Admiral Friedrich Hollmann. Kaiser and the rest of II Division became the training squadron for the fleet in 1889–1890, the first year the Kaiserliche Marine maintained a year-round ironclad force. The squadron escorted Wilhelm II's imperial yacht to the Mediterranean; the voyage included state visits to Italy and the Ottoman Empire. The squadron remained in the Mediterranean until April 1890, when it returned to Germany.

Kaiser participated in the ceremonial transfer of the island of Helgoland from British to German control in the summer of 1890. She was present during the fleet maneuvers in September, where the entire eight-ship armored squadron simulated a Russian fleet blockading Kiel. II Division, including Kaiser, served as the training squadron in the winter of 1890–1891. The squadron again cruised the Mediterranean, under the command of Rear Admiral Wilhelm Schröder. Between 1891 and 1895, Kaiser was rebuilt in the Imperial Dockyard in Wilhelmshaven. The ship was converted into an armored cruiser; her heavy guns were removed and replaced with lighter weapons, including one , six , and nine  guns. Her entire rigging equipment was removed and two heavy military masts were installed in place of the rigging. Despite the modernization, she remained quite slow. Deutschland and König Wilhelm were similarly converted.

Service in East Asia 
During the period of diplomatic tension between Britain and Germany caused by the Kruger telegram sent by Wilhelm II, Kaiser and several other overseas cruisers were ordered to return to German waters. This order was quickly reversed, as it was decided it would be seen as an act of weakness by Britain. In April 1896, while entering the port of Amoy, Kaiser struck an uncharted rock. Only minor damage was done to the hull, but the ship was still out of service for twenty-two days for repairs in Hong Kong. Kaiser served as the flagship of Rear Admiral Otto von Diederichs during his tenure as the division commander. Diederichs was tasked with locating a suitable concession to be used as the main port of the East Asia Division; after surveying a number of sites aboard Kaiser, Diederichs settled on Kiautschou Bay. In the wake of two violent incidents against Germans in China, Wilhelm II gave Diederichs permission to seize Kiautschou by force in November 1897.

After dusk on 10 November, Kaiser left Shanghai and headed toward Kiautschou. Prinzess Wilhelm and the unprotected cruiser  were to leave the following day to allay suspicion. The three ships rendezvoused on the 12th at sea; Diederichs intended to steam into Kiautschou on the 14th and seize the port. At 06:00 on the 14th, Cormoran steamed into the bay to bring the Chinese forts under fire, while Kaiser and Prinzess Wilhelm sent a landing force of some 700 men ashore. In the span of two hours, Diederichs's forces had captured the central and outlying forts and destroyed the Chinese telegraph, preventing them from notifying their superiors of the German attack. After negotiating with General Chang, the commander of the Kiautschou garrison, Diederichs succeeded in forcing the Chinese concession of Kiautschou to Germany, which he proclaimed at 14:20. Diederichs was promoted to vice admiral following the successful seizure of the port, and the division became enlarged to squadron size with the addition of several warships, including Kaisers sister Deutschland.

In May 1898, Diederichs sent Kaiser to Nagasaki for periodic maintenance. The Spanish–American War, which saw action in the Philippines at the Battle of Manila Bay, necessitated a German naval presence in the area to protect German nationals. Kaiser was still in Nagasaki undergoing repairs, so Diederichs ordered her and Prinzess Wilhelm, also in dock for maintenance, to meet him in Manila as soon as was possible. Crew transfers during the repair process necessitated Irene and Cormoran to meet in Manila as well; this concentration of five warships in the Philippines caused a serious crisis with the American Navy. Rear Admiral George Dewey objected to the size of the German force and to a meeting between Diederichs and Governor General Augustin, the Spanish governor of the Philippines. The German naval forces left the Philippines after the fall of Manila in August, though tensions with the United States continued for some time after.

Following his departure from Manila in August 1898, Diederichs took Kaiser south to the Dutch East Indies. There, the ship represented Germany during celebrations for the coronation of Queen Wilhelmina. The ship then returned to Hong Kong via Singapore, before proceeding to Fuchow for gunnery practice. While steaming into the bay, however, the ship ran aground on an uncharted rock. The screw corvette  and Cormoran arrived to tow Kaiser off the rocks, after which Diederichs sent her back to Hong Kong for repairs. Kaiser remained overseas until 1899, when she returned to Germany. She was reduced to a harbor ship on 3 May 1904 and renamed Uranus on 12 October 1905. Uranus was broken up in 1920 in Harburg.

Footnotes

Notes

Citations

References 

 
 
 
 
 
 

Kaiser-class ironclads
1874 ships